The Iroquois Central School District is a large school district about  outside of Buffalo, New York that consists of about  of land in the towns of Elma, Marilla, Wales, Aurora, Lancaster, and Bennington. The district consists of about 2,895 students in six schools. The superintendent of schools is Douglas Scofield. The district was founded in 1955.

Administration 
The District offices are located at 2111 Girdle Road in Elma. The current Superintendent is Douglas Scofield.

Administrators 
Douglas Scofield–Superintendent

Board of education 
David Lowrey–President

Selected former superintendents 
Previous assignment and reason for departure denoted in parentheses
Dr. Merton Haynes, PhD–1970-1988.
Michael A. Glover–1994-2003 (Superintendent - Waterville Central School District, named Superintendent of Genesee Valley BOCES)
James Knowles [interim]–2002-2003 (Principal - Iroquois High School, retired)
Neil A. Rochelle–2003-2010 (Superintendent - Keshequa Central School District, named Program Coordinator for Guam Department of Education)
Bruce Fraser–2010-2011 [interim] (Superintendent - Lockport City School District, retired)

Iroquois High School 

Iroquois High School is located at 2111 Girdle Road and serves grades 9 through 12. The current principal is Christopher Ginestre, and the current assistant principals are Douglas Beetow and Alexis Langheier.

History

Selected former principals 
Previous assignment and reason for departure denoted with in parentheses
Thomas L. Schnepper–1970-1991 (Asst. Principal - Niles Township High School - Skokie, Illinois; retired).
Richard A. Marotto–1990-1997 (Principal - Lewiston-Porter High School, retired)
James L. Knowles–1997-2002 (Social Studies teacher/Athletic Director - Iroquois High School, named Interim Superintendent of Iroquois Central School District)
Robert A. Coniglio–2002-2005 (Assistant Principal - Iroquois High School, named Assistant Principal of Pioneer High School)
Dennis G. Kenney–2005-2017 (Superintendent - Perry Central School District, retired)
Dean Ramirez–2017-2021 (Principal - Lewiston-Porter Middle School, named Assistant Superintendent of Orchard Park Central School District)
Athletics

Iroquois, a wrestling powerhouse in the 1950s and '60s,  established a then-national record for consecutive wins. The streak (1957-1967) reached 150 matches.

Iroquois Intermediate/Middle School 

Iroquois Intermediate/Middle School is located at 2111 Girdle Road and serves grades 5, 6, 7, and 8. The current principal is Ross Esslinger and the current assistant principal is Patrick O'Brien.

History

Selected former principals 
Previous assignment and reason for departure denoted within parentheses
K. Gary Bartoo;1978-1998 (Teacher, retired)
Charles Funke–1991-2000 (Assistant Principal/Athletics Director - Iroquois Senior High School, retired)
Anne Marotta–2000-2003 (Principal - Letchworth Middle School, named Assistant Superintendent for Curriculum & Instruction at Kenmore-Town of Tonawanda School District)
Brian M. Wiesinger–2003-2007 (Assistant Principal - Iroquois Senior High School, named Assistant Superintendent of Curriculum at Iroquois Central School District)
Ann Marie Spitzer–2007-2010 (Assistant Principal - West Seneca East Middle School, resigned)

Elma Primary School 

Elma Primary School is located at 711 Rice Road and serves grades K through 4. The current principal is Mrs. Darcy Walker.

History

Selected former principals 
Previous assignment and reason for departure denoted within parentheses
Rebecca Todd–?-1997
Renee Lorenz–1997-2006 (Principal - Akron Elementary, retired)
Martin D. Cox–2006-2007 (Principal - A.J. Clark Elementary School, named Principal of DeSales High School)
Julie Schwab–2007-2008 (Principal - Marilla Primary, named Director of Curriculum, Instruction, and Technology for Silver Creek Central School District)

Marilla Primary School 

Iroquois Primary School is located at 11683 Bullis Road in Marilla and serves grades K through 4. The current principal is Mrs. Amy Stanfield.

Selected former principals 
Previous assignment and reason for departure denoted in parentheses
Mrs. Judith Craig–1991-1998 (unknown, retired)
Dr. Gloria Zimmerman–1998-2004 (Director of Special Education - North Tonawanda City School District, retired)
Ms. Julie Schwab–2004-2007 (Assistant Principal - Errick Road Elementary, named Principal of Elma Primary)

Wales Primary 

Wales Primary School (Woodchuck School) is located at 4650 Woodchuck Road in the town of Wales, New York and serves grades K through 4. The current principal is Mrs. Kimberly Morrison.

History

Former principals 
Previous assignment and reason for departure denoted within parentheses
Sarah Chambers–?-2001
Kevin McGowan–2001-2006 (Assistant Principal - Iroquois Senior High School, named Superintendent of Warsaw Central School District)

Business First ranking
In recent years, the district has been on the honor roll of Buffalo Business First WNY Schools Ratings which are based on test scores. In 2008 it was ranked ninth. The high school was ranked eighth among public high schools, and the middle school was ranked tenth among public middle schools.

References

External links
Official site
Business First Ranking 

Education in Erie County, New York
School districts in New York (state)